Eldridge is an English surname and may refer to:

People

Surname
 A. D. Eldridge (1851–?), American politician, member of the Wisconsin State Assembly
 Aethelred Eldridge (1930–2018), American painter and art professor
 Alexandra Eldridge (born 1948), American contemporary painter
 Allen Eldridge, American board game designer
 Ambrose Eldridge (ca. 1815 – 1860), Australian chemist
 Asa Eldridge (1809–1856), American sea captain
 Ben Eldridge (born 1938), American banjo player and founder of the bluegrass group The Seldom Scene
 Brody Eldridge (William Brody Eldridge; born 1987), American football player
 Charles Eldridge (1854–1922), American stage and screen actor 
 Charles W. Eldridge (1877–1922), Massachusetts businessman and politician
 Chris Eldridge, American guitarist and singer
 Clarence Eldridge (1888–1981), American baseball umpire and advertising executive
 Clark Eldridge (1896–1990), American bridge engineer
 Conner Eldridge (William Conner Eldridge Jr.; born 1977), United States Attorney for the Western District of Arkansas (2010–2015)
 David Eldridge (disambiguation), several people
 Dekabriean Eldridge (born 1992), American basketball player
 Don Eldridge (1919–2007), American businessman and politician
 Elleanor Eldridge (1784/85 - ca. 1845), African American/Native American entrepreneur 
 Ernest Eldridge (1897–1937), British world land speed record holder
 Florence Eldridge (1901–1988), American actress
 Frederick G. Eldridge (1837–1889), president of the Knickerbocker Trust Company (1884)
 George H. Eldridge (1844–1918), an American soldier
Hope Tisdale Eldridge (1904–1991), American statistician, demographer
 Jamie Eldridge (born 1973), Massachusetts state senator
 Jeff Eldridge (born 1967), American politician, member of the West Virginia House of Delegates (2005–2011, and since 2013)
 Jim Eldridge (born 1944), British radio, film and television screenwriter
 Jimmy Eldridge (born 1948), American politician, member of the Tennessee House of Representatives (since 2003)
 JJ Eldridge, theoretical astrophysicist
 Joe Eldridge (disambiguation), several people
 John Eldridge (disambiguation), several people
 Laura Eldridge, American women's health writer and activist
 Lisa Eldridge (born 1966), make-up artist
 Marian Eldridge (1936–1997), Australian writer
 Marie D. Eldridge (1926–2009), American statistician
 Mildred Eldridge (1909–1991), British artist
 Osiris Eldridge (born 1988), American basketball player
 Paul Eldridge (1888–1982), American writer
 Ronnie Eldridge (née Myers), American activist, businesswoman, politician, and television host
 Roy Eldridge (1911–89), American jazz musician
 Sean Eldridge (born 1986), businessman and congressional candidate
 Tom Eldridge (1923–2006), Australian rules footballer
 Tony Eldridge (Anthony William Charles Eldridge; 1923–2015), Royal Navy officer

First name
 Eldridge Cleaver (1935–98), African-American activist
 Eldridge R. Johnson (1867–1945), co-founder of the Victor Talking Machine Company
 Eldridge Lovelace (1913–2008), American city planner and author
 Eldridge Recasner (born 1967), former college and professional basketball player
 Eldridge Small (born 1949), former American football player

Places
 Eldridge, Alabama, a town
 Eldridge, California, a census-designated place
 Eldridge, Iowa, a city
 Eldridge, Missouri, an unincorporated community
 Eldridge, North Dakota, an unincorporated community
 Eldridge Bay, a waterway in Canada

Other uses
 USS Eldridge (DE-173), a US Navy destroyer escort that served in World War II
 The Eldridge Hotel, a historic hotel in Lawrence, Kansas
 Eldridge House, a historic house in Taunton, Massachusetts
 Eldridge Industries, an investment company
 The Eldridge, a starship in the video game Xenogears

See also
 Eldredge (disambiguation)
 Eldritch (disambiguation)